Operation Cybersnare was a United States Secret Service operation in 1995 targeted at computer hackers.

In January 1995, the Secret Service set up an undercover bulletin board system in Bergen County, New Jersey. This was the first undercover Internet sting of its kind. With the help of an undercover informant, they advertised the bulletin board across the Internet. The topics for discussion were cellular telephone cloning and computer hacking.

In September, twelve raids across the country resulted in the arrest of six hackers. From the press release, those arrested were:

Richard Lacap, of Katy, Texas, who used the computer alias of "Chillin" and Kevin Watkins, of Houston, Texas, who used the computer alias of "Led". Lacap and Watkins were charged by criminal complaint with conspiring to break into the computer system of an Oregon Cellular Telephone company.
Jeremy Cushing, of Huntington Beach, California, who used the computer alias of "Alpha Bits", was charged with trafficking in cloned cellular telephone equipment and stolen access devices used to program cellular telephones.
Frank Natoli, of Brooklyn, New York, used the computer alias of "Mmind". He was charged with trafficking in stolen access devices used to program cellular telephones.
Al Bradford, of Detroit, Michigan, who used the computer alias of "Cellfone", was charged with trafficking in unauthorized access devices used to program cellular telephones.
Michael Clarkson, of Brooklyn, New York, who used the computer alias of "Barcode", was charged with possessing and trafficking in hardware used to obtain unauthorized access to telecommunications services.

Sources
 PMF, A British Hacker in America 
 Jeffrey Gold, "Internet Sting Operation Nets Six Attempting to Sell Stolen Data", Associated Press, 11 September 1995
 Geoff Boucher, "Computer Hacker Snared in Cyber-Sting : Technology: Huntington Beach man is one of six arrested in alleged plot to steal credit card and cellular phone codes.", Los Angeles Times, 12 September 1995 
 Geoff Boucher, "On-Line Sting Just the Beginning, Says Cyber-Sleuth Squad", Los Angeles Times, 13 September 1995
 Clifford J. Levy, "Secret Service Goes On Line and After Hackers", New York Times,  12 September 1995
 Reily Gregson, "SECRET SERVICE ATTACKS CELLULAR FRAUD AT SOURCE, STOPS COMPUTER HACKERS", RCR Wireless, 18 September 1995 
 CTIA press release: "Wireless Industry Salutes U.S. Secret Service", 11 September 1995. (Archived)

Cybercrime
Hacking (computer security)